David Castillo i Buïls (born Barcelona, 1961) is a Spanish poet, writer, and literary critic. He started out as a poet with counterculture and underground publications in the 1970s, although his first published work, a declaration of principles, was the biography of Bob Dylan in 1992. Three years earlier, he had been the anthologist of Ser del segle, which brought together leading voices of the generation of the 1980s. Then he began a career as a writer with novels like El cel de l'infern and No miris enrere, that were well accepted both by critics and the general public. No miris enrere won the Premi Sant Jordi de novel·la of 2001. Castillo has received  three times, and he has also been awarded the Italian "Tratti Poetry Prize for the best foreign poet" for his anthology of poetry translated into Italian. He has been organizing various poetic cycles. He is a founder of Poetry Week in Barcelona, and has been a director of it since 1997.

Since the return of democracy in Spain, Castillo has been publishing articles and literary criticism. Since 1989, he has been editor of the cultural supplement of the newspaper Avui, which in 2011 merged with  El Punt, forming El Punt Avui. For eight years, he has led the magazine Lletra de canvi. He has also worked for five year as a lecturer at the Autonomous University of Barcelona. Together with the young poet Marc Sardà, he has published the book Conversaciones con Pepín Bello, which has had a deep impact in criticism.

Works

Biography
1992 Bob Dylan
2007 Conversaciones con Pepín Bello, with Marc Sardà
2009 Bcn Rock, with Ferran Sendra

Poetry
1993 La muntanya russa
1994 Tenebra
1997 Poble Nou flash back, with Albert Chust
1998 Game over
2000 El pont de Mühlberg
2000 Seguint l'huracà, with Marcel Pey
2001 Bandera negra
2005 Menta i altres poemes
2006 Downtown
2006 Esquena nua
2011 Doble zero

Novels 
1999 El cel de l'infern
2002 No miris enrere
2009 El llibre dels mals catalans
2010 El mar de la tranquil·litat

Awards
1987 Premi Atlàntida millor revista cultural for the work "El temps"
1990 Premi Atlàntida millor suplement cultural diari Avui
1997 Premi Carles Riba de poesia for Game over
1999 Premi Joan Crexells de narrativa for El cel de l'infern
2001 Premi Sant Jordi de novel·la]] for No miris enrere
2005 Premi Atlàntida millor articulista de l'any en llengua catalana
2006 Premi Cadaqués al millor poemari de l'any for Esquena nua
2006 Italian Tratti Poetry Prize for Il presente abandonatto
2010 Premi Atlàntida millor suplement cultural diari El Punt Avui

Notes 

 

Writers from Barcelona
Poets from Catalonia
Living people
1961 births
Novelists from Catalonia
Literary critics from Catalonia
20th-century Spanish poets
21st-century Spanish poets
20th-century Spanish novelists
21st-century Spanish novelists
Spanish male poets
Spanish male novelists
20th-century Spanish male writers
21st-century Spanish male writers